Bezawada Gopala Reddy (5 August 1907 – 9 March 1997) was an Indian politician.  He was Chief Minister of the erstwhile Andhra State (28 March 1955 – 1 November 1956) and Governor of Uttar Pradesh (1 May 1967 – 1 July 1972). He was popularly known as Andhra Tagore. Both Gopal Reddy and his wife studied at Santhiniketan established by Rabindranath Tagore. It was during this time that Gopal Reddy took a liking for Tagore's works and translated many of his books into Telugu.

See also
List of Chief Ministers of Andhra Pradesh
Member A.I.C.C.,  since 1931 ; M.L.A., Madras, 1937–46 ; was Minister Local Administration, Government of Madras, 1937–39 ; President Andhra Pradesh, 1955–56 ; Finance Minister, Madras, 1947 ; Home Minister, Andhra Pradesh, 1956 ; Finance Minister, Andhra Pradesh, 1957 ; M.P. Rajya Sabha, 1958–60, Lok Sabha, 1962 ; Minister of Revenue and Civil Expenditure Government of India, 1958–61 ; Minister for  Information and Broadcasting 1962–63 ; resigned under the Kamraj Plan ; Chairman, Children's Film Society; President: Dakshin Bharat Hindi Prachar  Sabha (A.P.) ; Telugu Bhasha Samiti, since 1947 ; A.P. Sahitya Academy, since 1957 ; All-India Chess Federation, since 1959 ; Governor of U.P. since 1 May 1967.

Sources
Rulers
"'Sahithi Brindavana Sanchary' Dr. Bejawada Gopala Reddy" from C. P. Brown Academy

Awards

Raja-Lakshmi Award for the year 1989 from Sri Raja-Lakshmi Foundation, Chennai.

References

http://www.reddysociety.com/?q=node/33 

1907 births
1997 deaths
Chief Ministers of Andhra Pradesh
Telugu politicians
G
Chief ministers from Indian National Congress
Governors of Uttar Pradesh
People from Nellore district
Indian National Congress politicians from Andhra Pradesh
Recipients of the Sahitya Akademi Prize for Translation
Bengali–Telugu translators
Andhra movement